Emilio De Marchi may refer to:

 Emilio De Marchi (writer) (1851–1901), Italian novelist
 Emilio De Marchi (tenor) (1861–1917), Italian operatic tenor
 Emilio De Marchi (actor) (born 1959), Italian actor